Delta Crateris (δ Crt, δ Crateris; traditional name: Labrum) is a solitary star in the southern constellation of Crater. With an apparent visual magnitude of 3.56, it is the brightest star in this rather dim constellation. It has an annual parallax shift of 17.56 mas as measured from Earth, indicating Delta Crateris lies at a distance of 163 ± 4 light years from the Sun.

This is an evolved orange-hued giant star belonging to the spectral class K0 III. Delta Crateris is a member of the so-called red clump, indicating that it is generating energy through the thermonuclear fusion of helium at its core. The star has an estimated 1.56 times the mass of the Sun but has expanded to  times the Sun's radius.

The metallicity of the star – what astronomers term the abundance of elements other than hydrogen and helium – is only 33% that of the Sun. It is around 2.89 billion years old with a rotation rate that is too small to measure; the projected rotational velocity is 0.0 km/s. Delta Crateris is radiating  as much luminosity as the Sun from its outer envelope at an effective temperature of  K.

References

External links

K-type giants
Horizontal-branch stars
Crater (constellation)
Crateris, Delta
Durchmusterung objects
Crateris, 12
098430
055282
4382